← or <- may refer to:
 an arrow (symbol), character of Unicode
 an arrow key or a backspace on a keyboard
 ←, <<, <-, representing the assignment operator in various programming languages
 a converse implication in logic
 the relative direction of left or back
 "Caused by" (and other meanings), in medical notation

See also
 Arrow (disambiguation)
 ↑ (disambiguation)
 ↓ (disambiguation)
 → (disambiguation)